White Lake Provincial Park is a provincial park in British Columbia, Canada and is located 10 kilometres northeast of Balmoral, British Columbia. Established in 1965, the park is just west of Cedar Creek Camp, a park owned by the not-for-profit organisation of People In Motion.  The lake is popular with anglers fishing for rainbow trout; in terms of angler days, it is one of the top three fishing lakes in the province.

Recreation 
The following recreational activities are available: camping, swimming, canoeing, kayaking, boating, rainbow trout fishing and ice fishing.

References

External links
White Lake Provincial Park

Parks in the Shuswap Country
Provincial parks of British Columbia